El Verano (Spanish for "The Summer") is a census-designated place (CDP) in Sonoma Valley, Sonoma County, California, United States. The population was 4,123 at the 2010 census, falling to 3,867 at the 2020 census.

History

El Verano's name is Spanish and means "The Summer." Resorts in El Verano, and the other nearby communities of Boyes Hot Springs, Fetters Hot Springs, and Agua Caliente were popular health retreats for tourists from San Francisco and points beyond until the middle of the 20th century because of the geothermic hot springs found in the area.

Geography
El Verano is a western suburb of the City of Sonoma.

Demographics

2020 Census
The population enumerated in 2020 was 3,867.

2010
The 2010 United States Census reported that El Verano had a population of 4,123. The racial makeup of El Verano was 3,054 (74.1%) White, 22 (0.5%) African American, 22 (0.5%) Native American, 101 (2.4%) Asian, 12 (0.3%) Pacific Islander, 717 (17.4%) from other races, and 195 (4.7%) from two or more races. Hispanic or Latino of any race were 1,559 persons (37.8%).

The 2010 Census reported that 99.5% of the population lived in households and 0.5% lived in non-institutionalized group quarters.

There were 1,466 households, out of which 570 (38.9%) had children under the age of 18 living in them, 732 (49.9%) were opposite-sex married couples living together, 166 (11.3%) had a female householder with no husband present, 96 (6.5%) had a male householder with no wife present.  There were 116 (7.9%) unmarried opposite-sex partnerships, and 18 (1.2%) same-sex married couples or partnerships. 334 households (22.8%) were made up of individuals, and 104 (7.1%) had someone living alone who was 65 years of age or older. The average household size was 2.80.  There were 994 families (67.8% of all households); the average family size was 3.33.

The population was spread out, with 1,089 people (26.4%) under the age of 18, 330 people (8.0%) aged 18 to 24, 1,136 people (27.6%) aged 25 to 44, 1,173 people (28.5%) aged 45 to 64, and 395 people (9.6%) who were 65 years of age or older.  The median age was 35.7 years. For every 100 females, there were 98.3 males.  For every 100 females age 18 and over, there were 97.3 males.

The homeowner vacancy rate was 1.7%; the rental vacancy rate was 4.1%. 48.7% of the population lived in owner-occupied housing units and 50.8% lived in rental housing units.

2000
As of the census of 2000, there were 3,954 people, 1,461 households, and 981 families residing in the CDP. The racial makeup of the CDP was 82.83% White, 0.30% African American, 0.99% Native American, 1.37% Asian, 0.08% Pacific Islander, 8.90% from other races, and 5.54% from two or more races. Hispanic or Latino of any race were 23.32% of the population.

There were 1,461 households, out of which 35.8% had children under the age of 18 living with them, 51.7% were married couples living together, 11.7% had a female householder with no husband present, and 32.8% were non-families. 25.1% of all households were made up of individuals, and 8.6% had someone living alone who was 65 years of age or older.  The average household size was 2.69 and the average family size was 3.26.

In the CDP, the population was spread out, with 26.7% under the age of 18, 8.6% from 18 to 24, 30.8% from 25 to 44, 24.3% from 45 to 64, and 9.6% who were 65 years of age or older.  The median age was 36 years. For every 100 females, there were 96.1 males.  For every 100 females age 18 and over, there were 93.9 males.

The median income for a household in the CDP was $54,400, and the median income for a family was $60,000. Males had a median income of $40,142 versus $31,528 for females. The per capita income for the CDP was $28,292.  About 4.3% of families and 6.0% of the population were below the poverty line, including 6.4% of those under age 18 and 4.9% of those age 65 or over.

Government
In the state legislature, El Verano is in the 3rd Senate District, represented by Democrat Bill Dodd, and in the 10th State Assembly District, represented by Democrat Marc Levine.

References

External links

Census-designated places in Sonoma County, California
Sonoma Valley
Census-designated places in California